Komedija Theatre is a theatre in Zagreb, Croatia which specializes in musicals. It was opened in 1950 as a legal successor to the Zagreb Drama Theatre and the Vedri Kerempuh Theatre. Notable pieces that premiered there include the 1971 musical Jalta, Jalta and the first Croatian rock opera Gubec-beg (1981).

History
The theater was opened on November 1, 1950 as a merger of two previous theaters and is situated in a building on Kaptol street in the old city centre of Zagreb.

References

Theatres in Zagreb